After seizing power in the 1972 coup d'état, Major Mathieu Kérékou declared the People's Republic of Benin a Marxist-Leninist state and sought financial support from communist governments in Eastern Europe and Asia. To distance the modern state from its colonial past, the country became the People's Republic of Benin in 1975. However, Benin dropped the socialist ideology in 1989 following pressure from creditors and domestic unrest related to economic hardship.

In recent years Benin has strengthened ties with France, the former colonial power, as well as the United States and the main international lending institutions. Benin has also adopted a mediating role in the political crises in Liberia, Guinea-Bissau, and Togo and provided a contribution to the United Nations force in Haiti, all of which were indications of the country's growing confidence in the international community. Some of the allies of Benin are France, India, US, UK, Netherlands, Ghana, and China.

Bilateral relations

Transnational Issues

Disputes
In September 2007, Economic Community of West African States (ECOWAS) intervened to attempt to resolve the dispute over two villages along the Benin-Burkina Faso border that remain from 2005 ICJ decision; much of Benin-Niger boundary, including tripoint with Nigeria, remains undemarcated; in 2005, Nigeria ceded thirteen villages to Benin, but border relations remain strained by rival cross-border gang clashes; talks continue between Benin and Togo on funding the Adjrala hydroelectric dam on the Mona River.

Refugees
Refugees (country of origin): 9,444 (Togo) (2007)

Illicit Drugs
Transshipment point used by traffickers for cocaine destined for Western Europe; vulnerable to money laundering due to poorly enforced financial regulations (2008)

See also
 List of diplomatic missions in Benin
 List of diplomatic missions of Benin

Notes

External links
  Benin–Russia relations at the Russian Ministry of Foreign Affairs